Sandy Hollow-Escondidas is a census-designated place (CDP) in Nueces County, Texas, United States. The population was 296 at the 2010 census, down from 433 at the 2000 census.

Geography
Sandy Hollow-Escondidas is located at  (27.947197, -97.820581).

Demographics
As of the census of 2000, there were 433 people, 150 households, and 111 families residing in the CDP. The population density was 54.2 people per square mile (20.9/km2). There were 203 housing units at an average density of 25.4/sq mi (9.8/km2). The racial makeup of the CDP was 80.60% White, 0.23% African American, 0.23% Native American, 13.39% from other races, and 5.54% from two or more races. Hispanic or Latino of any race were 54.27% of the population.

There were 150 households, out of which 34.7% had children under the age of 18 living with them, 56.7% were married couples living together, 12.7% had a female householder with no husband present, and 26.0% were non-families. 20.0% of all households were made up of individuals, and 10.0% had someone living alone who was 65 years of age or older. The average household size was 2.89 and the average family size was 3.41.

In the CDP, the population was spread out, with 29.6% under the age of 18, 5.1% from 18 to 24, 27.3% from 25 to 44, 25.9% from 45 to 64, and 12.2% who were 65 years of age or older. The median age was 37 years. For every 100 females, there were 104.2 males. For every 100 females age 18 and over, there were 100.7 males.

The median income for a household in the CDP was $40,469, and the median income for a family was $40,938. Males had a median income of $28,125 versus $19,821 for females. The per capita income for the CDP was $14,458. About 14.5% of families and 16.5% of the population were below the poverty line, including 15.7% of those under age 18 and 10.4% of those age 65 or over.

Education
It is in the Banquete Independent School District.

References

Census-designated places in Nueces County, Texas
Census-designated places in Texas
Corpus Christi metropolitan area